Stadel Mountain is a mountain located in the Catskill Mountains of New York southeast of Gregorytown. Morton Hill is located east, and Baxter Mountain is located west-northwest of Stadel Mountain.

References

Mountains of Delaware County, New York
Mountains of New York (state)